Pentti Juhani Saikkonen (born 12 February 1952) is a Finnish statistician specializing in time series analysis.

Since 2004 he is a professor of statistics at the University of Helsinki.

A native of Lahti, Saikkonen attended the University of Helsinki, where he earned his licentiate in 1981, and his doctorate in 1986.

Selected publications

References

External links 
 Website at the University of Helsinki

1952 births
Living people
Finnish statisticians
Time series econometricians
University of Helsinki alumni